Lakas–Christian Muslim Democrats, abbreviated as Lakas–CMD and popularly known as Lakas, was a political party in the Philippines. Its ideology and that of its successor is heavily influenced by Christian and Islamic democracy. The party's influence on Philippine society is very strong, especially after the People Power Revolution, which has led the country to elect two presidents from the party, namely Fidel V. Ramos, a United Methodist, and Gloria Macapagal Arroyo, a Roman Catholic.

In May 2009, Lakas–CMD merged with Arroyo's Kabalikat ng Mamamayang Pilipino, thereby being known as Lakas Kampi CMD, a completely new entity. In May 2012, Lakas Kampi CMD renamed itself again as Lakas–CMD after the separation of KAMPI.

History

Early days and Ramos administration

In late 1985, the Partido Demokratiko Pilipino (founded in February 1982), Lakas ng Bayan (LABAN), and Lakas ng Bansa parties united to form the United Nationalist Democratic Organization (UNIDO) coalition. The alliance supported the candidacies of housewife Corazon C. Aquino and former Member of the Interim Batasang Pambansa Salvador H. Laurel for president and vice president, respectively, in the February 7, 1986, snap election.

By 1986, the PDP had formally merged with LABAN, the party founded in 1978 by Senator Benigno Aquino Jr., Corazon Aquino's husband, to form the PDP–Laban.

In the May 1987 legislative elections, UNIDO, under the name "Lakas ng Bayan", became the dominant party in both Houses of Congress, electing Representative Ramon Mitra, Jr. of Palawan as Speaker of the House of Representatives. UNIDO would be dissolved soon after.

In mid-1988, PDP–Laban was split into two factions: the Pimentel Wing of Senator Aquilino Pimentel, Jr. of Misamis Oriental and the Cojuangco Wing of Tarlac Representative Jose "Peping" Cojuangco, Jr. The Cojuangco Wing and the Lakas ng Bansa party of Speaker Mitra merged on September 16, 1988, to form the Laban ng Demokratikong Pilipino party while the Pimentel Wing remained as the PDP–Laban party.

In 1991, as LDP was preparing for its plans for the upcoming May 1992 national elections, several well-known politicians in the country jockeyed the party to get its nomination for several national positions. In the same year, President Cory Aquino's National Defense Secretary and retired General Fidel V. Ramos joined the party in order to gain its support for his 1992 presidential bid.

On November 30, 1991, LDP, then the nation's largest political party, held a national convention to select its presidential and vice presidential candidates for the 1992 Philippine presidential election. In the convention, Mitra and Ramos vied for the presidential nomination. After losing the nomination to Mitra, Ramos cried foul and bolted the party in December 1991. He later founded the United People Power Movement (UPPM) together with then-Pangasinan 4th District Representative Jose de Venecia Jr., and the name was later changed to Partido Lakas ng Tao (People Power Party). The new party was formally launched on January 3, 1992, at the Club Filipino in Greenhills, San Juan.

Upon the initiative of Congressman de Venecia, Ramos merged the party with the National Union of Christian Democrats (NUCD), a cluster of the Progressive Party of the Philippines founded in 1968 by former senator Raul Manglapus as the Christian Democratic Socialist Movement. As they coalesced, the party became known as Lakas ng Tao–National Union of Christian Democrats, with Lakas ng Tao usually just shortened to "Lakas" and abbreviated as Lakas–NUCD.

Ramos invited then-Cebu Governor Emilio Mario Osmeña Jr. to be his running-mate for the 1992 elections. Ramos won the May 11, 1992 election, garnering 23.58% of the vote and defeating former Agrarian Reform Secretary Miriam Defensor-Santiago of the People's Reform Party, Speaker Mitra and four other presidential contenders. Osmeña lost the vice-presidential election, placing third behind Senator Joseph E. Estrada of the Nationalist People's Coalition and Mitra's running mate, former Chief Justice of the Supreme Court Marcelo B. Fernan. Santiago cried fraud and filed an electoral protest citing power outages as evidence. Her protest was eventually dismissed by the Supreme Court of the Philippines in a technicality.

Since Ramos got a low plurality in the election, de Venecia created the Rainbow Coalition, converging political parties that include Lakas, LDP, NPC, and other minor parties to make a solid majority in the House. In late 1994, it formed a coalition government with the LDP for the 1995 Philippine legislative elections. This coalition, dubbed the "Lakas–Laban Coalition", won a majority in both Houses of Congress. In 1997, the party was joined by another Progressive Party cluster, the United Muslim Democrats of the Philippines (UMDP) of Ambassador Sanchez A. Ali, thereby changing the party's name to Lakas ng Tao–National Union of Christian Democrats–United Muslim Democrats of the Philippines (Lakas–NUCD–UMDP).

In November 1997, Lakas held its National Convention to select its nominees for the May 1998 national elections. The long list of contenders for the presidential nomination had been abridged which resulted in a close nominal fight between President Fidel V. Ramos's two leading political lieutenants, House Speaker Jose de Venecia and National Defense Secretary Renato de Villa of Batangas. After two rounds of secret balloting that month, de Venecia won the nomination and was officially proclaimed by Ramos as the Lakas–NUCD–UMDP presidential nominee for the 1998 elections.

After losing the nomination, Secretary de Villa protested and eventually bolted the party. He later formed Partido para sa Demokratikong Reporma (Party for Democratic Reform) and selected Pangasinan Governor Oscar Orbos as his vice-presidential running-mate for the 1998 polls. De Villa's Reporma and Orbos's Lapiang Manggagawa coalesced and formed the Reporma–Lapiang Manggagawa coalition.

Former Cebu Governor Emilio Osmeña, who also contended for the Lakas presidential nomination, also left the party and later launched his presidential bid under his newly-formed party, Probinsya Muna Development Initiative (PROMDI), with Assembly Member of the Southern Philippine Council for Peace and Development Ismael Sueno as running-mate for vice president.

Meanwhile, Lakas nominated then-Senator Gloria Macapagal Arroyo of Pampanga as its candidate for vice president. Arroyo had originally intended to run for president under her party, Kabalikat ng Mamamayang Pilipino (KAMPI). Arroyo joined Lakas to become the official candidate of the party.

De Venecia lost the May 11, 1998, election to Vice President Joseph E. Estrada of Laban ng Makabayang Masang Pilipino (LAMMP) by a significant plurality. Arroyo won the vice presidency in the same manner as Estrada, defeating Estrada's running mate, Senator Edgardo Angara. Arroyo emerged victorious in the vice-presidential race while her KAMPI party was in hiatus.

Arroyo administration
 
In early 2004, the party's name was shortened and changed into the current Lakas–Christian Muslim Democrats (Lakas–CMD).  However, the meaning of Lakas in the party name is usually now referred to as "Lakas ng EDSA" ("The Strength of EDSA") than the original "Lakas ng Tao" ("The Strength of the People"/"People Power"). This is also the name that the party used when it participated in the May 10, 2004, general elections as a leading member of the K4 Coalition. President Gloria Arroyo, who succeeded the deposed President Joseph Estrada, was the K4 Coalition candidate for President in the May 2004 presidential election, eventually winning over her opponents primarily movie actor Fernando Poe Jr. and Senator Panfilo Lacson.

After Poe's unsuccessful bid to the presidency, his supporters, which also included Estrada supporters, viewed the election results as fraudulent, and came under legal protest by Poe and his vice-presidential running-mate, former senator Loren Legarda. The poll protest was later thrown out by the Supreme Court acting as the Presidential Electoral Tribunal, as well as Legarda's protest.

At the onset of 2006, Lakas–CMD was torn by factional rivalry between supporters of President Arroyo and supporters of former President Fidel V. Ramos. Issues include transitory provisions in a proposed Constitution to scrap mid-term elections (or "no-el") set for 2007 and calls for her to step down in time for the elections, which is related to the "no-el" controversy. The party held its Annual Party Directorate Meeting on January 14, 2006, to discuss these matters.

There are no official results available of the May 2007 elections released by the party, but according to the Philippine House of Representatives, the party held 79 out of 235 seats.

On January 16, 2008, Lakas–CMD spokesman and legal counsel Raul Lambino stated that Lakas–CMD officially released the list of senatorial bets for 2010. Except for Parañaque Representative Eduardo Zialcita, they were not yet identified. However, Lambino named incumbent Senators Ramon Revilla Jr. and Lito Lapid, former senator Ralph Recto and former Congressman Prospero Pichay as among those considered.

De Venecia's resignation

Former House Speaker de Venecia resigned his post as president of Lakas on March 10, 2008, and rejected the proposition of former President Ramos to give him the title Chairman Emeritus. The current Speaker of the House Prospero Nograles (Davao City–1st District) was sworn-in as the new party president and former House Speaker Feliciano Belmonte Jr. as Vice President for Metro Manila Affairs on the same day.

Merger with KAMPI
On June 18, 2008, President Gloria Arroyo confirmed the historical merger of the Lakas–CMD and the Kabalikat ng Malayang Pilipino (KAMPI) parties. Both parties adopted the “equity of the incumbent” principle, as the merger will account for almost 200 national and 8,000 local officials, amid President Arroyo's prediction of May 2010 elections victory. Lakas–CMD President Prospero Nograles and KAMPI Chairman Ronaldo Puno signed the covenant at the regional caucus held in Davao City. Ramos, the party chairman-emeritus, announced on February 6, 2008, that Lakas–CMD would be the surviving entity after its merger with KAMPI.

On August 9, 2009, de Venecia Jr. and Ramos led fifty members from the Lakas–Kampi–CMD in objecting to its merger with KAMPI on May 28, 2009. The faction made de Venecia its President with Ramos as its Chairman Emeritus. However, Ramos later refused the offer of being the party's chairman-emeritus after being named in the interim party organization. De Venecia has filed a resolution at the Commission on Elections to declare null and void the merger. However, the Supreme Court ultimately upheld the legality of the merger, citing the failure of de Venecia “to sufficiently show that any grave abuse of discretion was committed by the Commission on Elections in rendering the challenged resolution.”

Ideology
Lakas-CMD has always focused on economic growth and development, stronger ties with the United States, creation of jobs, and strong cooperation between the executive and legislative branches of government. It is known for its advocacy of a shift from the present presidential system to a parliamentary form of government through constitutional amendments and through establishing peace talks with Muslim separatists and communist rebels. The party democracy is distinct in its ecumenical inclusion of Muslim leaders in its political alliance.

Electoral performance

Presidential election and vice president

Legislative elections

Candidates for Philippine general elections

1998

For senator 
Lakas put up a full senatorial slate during the May 11, 1998, national elections, as it propels the machinery of its candidates House Speaker Jose de Venecia and Senator Gloria Macapagal Arroyo to the presidency and vice presidency respectively against the Laban ng Makabayang Masang Pilipino (Struggle of Patriotic Filipino Masses) coalition of the opposition led by Vice President Joseph Estrada and Senator Edgardo Angara.

Lakas-NUCD-UMDP gained 5 out of 12 possible seats in the Senate namely: (in order of votes received)

 Loren Legarda
 Renato Cayetano
 Robert Barbers
 Ramon Revilla Sr.
 Teofisto Guingona Jr. (appointed vice-president in 2001)

Coalitions
Lakas–CMD had coalesced with other parties in the past elections, enabling it to strengthen its political power both in the national and local levels:
Lakas–Kampi–CMD, the dominant majority party in the 2010 national elections.
 TEAM Unity, the name of the pro-Arroyo coalition in the 2007 midterm elections.
 Koalisyon ng Katapatan at Karanasan sa Kinabukasan (K-4, Coalition of Truth and Experience for the Future), the name of the pro-Arroyo coalition in the 2004 national elections.
 People Power Coalition, the name of pro-Arroyo coalition in the 2001 midterm elections.
 Lakas-Laban Coalition, the name of the pro-Ramos coalition in the 1995 midterm elections.

Notable members
Fidel V. Ramos (12th President of the Philippines; party chairman-emeritus and former party chairman; co-founder)
Gloria Macapagal Arroyo (14th President of the Philippines; party chairperson)
Martin Romualdez (Representative, Leyte's 1st District; current party president)
Bong Revilla Jr. (Senator; former party chairman)
Teofisto Guingona Jr. (former Vice President of the Philippines; former party president)
Raul Manglapus (Senator; co-founder)
Loren Legarda (Senator)
Leticia Ramos-Shahani (Senate President pro tempore)
Ramon Magsaysay Jr. (Senator)
Franklin Drilon (Senator)
Sergio Osmeña III (Senator)
Robert Barbers (Senator)
Renato Cayetano (Senator)
Ramon Revilla Sr. (Senator)
Robert Jaworski (Senator)
Jose de Venecia Jr. (Speaker of the House of Representatives; former party president and co-founder)
Joker Arroyo (Senator)
Ralph Recto (Senator)
Eduardo Ermita (executive secretary) 
Juan Flavier (Secretary of Health; senator)
Ariel Magcalas (former Mayor of Santa Cruz, Laguna)
Lito Lapid (former Governor of Pampanga, senator)
Pia Cayetano (Senator)
Richard J. Gordon (Senator)

Notes

References

1991 establishments in the Philippines
Christian democratic parties in Asia
Defunct political parties in the Philippines
Islamic political parties
Political parties established in 1991
Political parties disestablished in 2008

tl:Lakas-Christian Muslim Democrats